Putt-Putt may refer to:
 Putt-putt golf or miniature golf
 Putt-Putt (series), a children's adventure and puzzle computer game series
 Putt-Putt Fun Center, a chain of amusement centers and miniature golf courses
 Railroad speeder or putt-putt, a small motorized vehicle used on railroads
 Putt-putt, a test rocket used during Project Orion
 Putt-Putt, an auxiliary power unit aboard an aircraft

See also
 Putt (disambiguation)